Arvo Kukumägi (9 August 1958, Litvina village, Setomaa – 16 May 2017) was an Estonian film and theatre actor.

In 1980 he graduated from Tallinn State Conservatory's Performing Arts Department. 1980-1984 he was an actor at Estonian SSR State Youth Theatre. Since 1984 he was a freelance actor.

In total, he acted or appeared in 50 films and 13 plays.

Selected filmography
Metskannikesed (1980)
Tants aurukatla ümber (1987)
Äratus (1989)
Rahu tänav (1991)
Firewater (1994)
All My Lenins (1997)
The Heart of the Bear (2001)
Revolution of Pigs (2004)
The Visit of the Old Lady (2006)
Georg (2007)
Graveyard Keeper's Daughter (2011)
November (2017)

References

1958 births
2017 deaths
Estonian male stage actors
Estonian male film actors
Estonian male television actors
20th-century Estonian male actors
21st-century Estonian male actors
Estonian Academy of Music and Theatre alumni
People from Setomaa Parish